The M and J Nelson Building (also known as the J. C. Penney Building) is a building in downtown McAllen, Texas, that is listed in the National Register of Historic Places and is a Recorded Texas Historic Landmark.

It is a three-story reinforced concrete two-part commercial block building built between 1948 and 1950 for the J. C. Penney Company. It was built in Streamlined Moderne style, with horizontal bands of red and buff brick and cast stone trim, and with aluminum entrance doors and stair rails and two exterior display cases at its Chicago Avenue entrance.

It was one of few buildings in McAllen having an elevator at the time it was built, and one of few with air conditioning.

See also

National Register of Historic Places listings in Hidalgo County, Texas
Recorded Texas Historic Landmarks in Hidalgo County

References

External links

Buildings and structures in Hidalgo County, Texas
McAllen, Texas
National Register of Historic Places in Hidalgo County, Texas
Recorded Texas Historic Landmarks